An intentional community is a voluntary residential community which is designed to have a high degree of social cohesion and teamwork from the start. The members of an intentional community typically hold a common social, political, religious, or spiritual vision, and typically share responsibilities and property. This way of life is sometimes characterized as an "alternative lifestyle". Intentional communities can be seen as social experiments or communal experiments. The multitude of intentional communities includes collective households, cohousing communities, coliving, ecovillages, monasteries, survivalist retreats, kibbutzim, hutterites, ashrams, and housing cooperatives.

History 

Ashrams are likely the earliest intentional communities founded around 1500 BCE, while Buddhist monasteries appeared around 500 BCE. Pythagoras founded an intellectual vegetarian commune in about 525 BCE in southern Italy. Hundreds of modern intentional communities were formed across Europe, North and South America, Australia, and New Zealand out of the intellectual foment of utopianism. Intentional communities exhibit the utopian ambition to create a better, more sustainable world for living. Nevertheless, the term utopian community as a synonym for an intentional community might be considered to be of pejorative nature and many intentional communities do not consider themselves to be utopian. Also the alternative term commune is considered to be non-neutral or even linked to leftist politics or hippies.

Synonyms and Definitions 
Additional terms referring to an intentional community can be alternative lifestyle, intentional society, cooperative community, withdrawn community, enacted community, socialist colony, communistic society, collective settlement, communal society, commune, mutualistic community, communitarian experiment, experimental community, utopian experiment, practical utopia, and utopian society.

Variety 
The purposes of intentional communities vary and may be political, spiritual, economic, or environmental. In addition to spiritual communities, secular communities also exist. One common practice, particularly in spiritual communities, is communal meals. Egalitarian values can be combined with other values. Benjamin Zablocki categorized communities this way:
 Alternative-family communities (see Tenacious Unicorn Ranch)
 Coliving communities
 Cooperative communities
 Countercultural communities
 Egalitarian communities
 Experimental communities
 Political communities
 Psychological communities (based on mystical or gestalt principles)
 Rehabilitational communities (see Synanon)
 Religious communities
 Spiritual communities

Membership 
Members of Christian intentional communities want to emulate the practices of the earliest believers. Using the biblical book of Acts (and, often, the Sermon on the Mount) as a model, members of these communities strive to demonstrate their faith in a corporate context, and to live out the teachings of the New Testament, practicing compassion and hospitality. Communities such as the Simple Way, the Bruderhof and Rutba House would fall into this category. Despite strict membership criteria, these communities are open to visitors and not reclusive to the extent of some other intentional communities.

A survey in the 1995 edition of the "Communities Directory", published by Fellowship for Intentional Community (FIC), reported that 54 percent of the communities choosing to list themselves were rural, 28 percent were urban, 10 percent had both rural and urban sites, and 8 percent did not specify.

Governance 
The most common form of governance in intentional communities is democratic (64 percent), with decisions made by some form of consensus decision-making or voting. A hierarchical or authoritarian structure governs 9 percent of communities, 11 percent are a combination of democratic and hierarchical structure, and 16 percent do not specify.

Core principles 
The central characteristics of communes, or core principles that define communes, have been expressed in various forms over the years. The term "communitarian" was invented by the Suffolk-born radical John Goodwyn Barmby, subsequently a Unitarian minister.

At the start of the 1970s, The New Communes author Ron E. Roberts classified communes as a subclass of a larger category of Utopias. He listed three main characteristics: first, egalitarianism – that communes specifically rejected hierarchy or graduations of social status as being necessary to social order. Second, human scale – that members of some communes saw the scale of society as it was then organized as being too industrialized (or factory sized) and therefore unsympathetic to human dimensions. And third, that communes were consciously anti-bureaucratic.

Twenty five years later, Dr. Bill Metcalf, in his edited book Shared Visions, Shared Lives defined communes as having the following core principles: the importance of the group as opposed to the nuclear family unit, a "common purse", a collective household, group decision making in general and intimate affairs. Sharing everyday life and facilities, a commune is an idealized form of family, being a new sort of "primary group" (generally with fewer than 20 people although there are examples of much larger communes). Commune members have emotional bonds to the whole group rather than to any sub-group, and the commune is experienced with emotions which go beyond just social collectivity.

By region 
With the simple definition of a commune as an intentional community with 100% income sharing, the online directory of the Fellowship for Intentional Community (FIC) lists 222 communes worldwide (28 January 2019). Some of these are religious institutions such as abbeys and monasteries. Others are based in anthroposophic philosophy, including Camphill villages that provide support for the education, employment, and daily lives of adults and children with developmental disabilities, mental health problems or other special needs. Many communes are part of the New Age movement.

Many cultures naturally practice communal or tribal living, and would not designate their way of life as a planned 'commune' per se, though their living situation may have many characteristics of a commune.

Australia 
In Australia, many intentional communities started with the hippie movement and those searching for social alternatives to the nuclear family. One of the oldest continuously running communities is called "Moora Moora Co-operative Community" with about 47 members (Oct 2021). Located at the top of Mount Toolebewong, 65km east of Melbourne, Victoria at an altitude of 600–800 m, this community has been entirely off the electricity grid since its inception in 1974. Founding members still resident include Peter and Sandra Cock.

Germany 
In Germany, a large number of the intentional communities define themselves as communes and there is a network of political communes called "Kommuja" with about 30 member groups (May 2009). Germany has a long tradition of intentional communities going back to the groups inspired by the principles of Lebensreform in the 19th century. Later, about 100 intentional communities were started in the Weimar Republic after World War I; many had a communal economy. In the 1960s, there was a resurgence of communities calling themselves communes, starting with the Kommune 1 in Berlin, followed by Kommune 2 (also Berlin) and Kommune 3 in Wolfsburg.

In the German commune book, communes are defined by Elisabeth Voß as communities which:
 Live and work together
 Have a communal economy, i.e. common finances and common property (land, buildings, means of production)
 Have communal decision making – usually consensus decision making
 Try to reduce hierarchy and hierarchical structures
 Have communalization of housework, childcare and other communal tasks
 Have equality between women and men
 Have low ecological footprints through sharing and saving resources

Israel 

Kibbutzim in Israel, (sing., kibbutz) are examples of officially organized communes, the first of which were based on agriculture. Other Israeli communities are Neve Shalom, Kvutza, Yishuv Kehilati, Moshavim and Kfar No'ar. Today, there are dozens of urban communes growing in the cities of Israel, often called urban kibbutzim. The urban kibbutzim are smaller and more anarchist. Most of the urban communes in Israel emphasize social change, education, and local involvement in the cities where they live. Some of the urban communes have members who are graduates of zionist-socialist youth movements, like HaNoar HaOved VeHaLomed, HaMahanot HaOlim and Hashomer Hatsair.

Ireland 
In 1831 John Vandeleur (a landlord) established a commune on his Ralahine Estate at Newmarket-on-Fergus, County Clare. Vandeleur asked Edward Thomas Craig, an English socialist, to formulate rules and regulations for the commune. It was set up with a population of 22 adult single men, 7 married women and their 7 husbands, 5 single women, 4 orphan boys and 5 children under the age of 9 years. No money was employed, only credit notes which could be used in the commune shop. All occupants were committed to a life with no alcohol, tobacco, snuff or gambling. All were required to work for 12 hours a day during the summer and from dawn to dusk in winter. The social experiment prospered for a time and 29 new members joined. However, in 1833 the experiment collapsed due to the gambling debts of John Vandeleur. The members of the commune met for the last time on 23 November 1833 and placed on record a declaration of "the contentment, peace and happiness they had experienced for two years under the arrangements introduced by Mr. Vandeleur and Mr. Craig and which through no fault of the Association was now at an end".

Russia 
In imperial Russia, the vast majority of Russian peasants held their land in communal ownership within a mir community, which acted as a village government and a cooperative. The very widespread and influential pre-Soviet Russian tradition of Monastic communities of both sexes could also be considered a form of communal living. After the end of communism in Russia, monastic communities have again become more common, populous and, to a lesser degree, more influential in Russian society. Various patterns of Russian behavior —  (толока),  (помочи),  (артель) — are also based on communal ("мирские") traditions.

South Africa 
In 1991, Afrikaners in South Africa founded the controversial Afrikaner-only town of Orania, with the goal of creating a stronghold for the Afrikaner minority group, the Afrikaans language and the Afrikaner culture.  By 2022, the population was 2,500. The town was experiencing rapid growth and the population had climbed by 55% from 2018.  They favour a model of strict Afrikaner self-sufficiency and have their own currency, bank, local government and only employ Afrikaners.

United Kingdom 
A 19th century advocate and practitioner of communal living was the utopian socialist John Goodwyn Barmby, who founded a Communist Church before becoming a Unitarian minister.

The Simon Community in London is an example of social cooperation, made to ease homelessness within London. It provides food and religion and is staffed by homeless people and volunteers. Mildly nomadic, they run street "cafés" which distribute food to their known members and to the general public.

The Bruderhof has three locations in the UK. In Glandwr, near Crymych, Pembrokeshire, a co-op called Lammas Ecovillage focuses on planning and sustainable development. Granted planning permission by the Welsh Government in 2009, it has since created 9 holdings and is a central communal hub for its community. In Scotland, the Findhorn Foundation founded by Peter and Eileen Caddy and Dorothy Maclean in 1962 is prominent for its educational centre and experimental architectural community project based at The Park, in Moray, Scotland, near the village of Findhorn.

The Findhorn Ecovillage community at The Park, Findhorn, a village in Moray, Scotland, and at Cluny Hill in Forres, now houses more than 400 people.

Historic agricultural examples include the Diggers settlement on St George's Hill, Surrey during the English Civil War and the Clousden Hill Free Communist and Co-operative Colony near Newcastle upon Tyne during the 1890s.

United States 

There is a long history of utopian communities in America which led to the rise in the communes of the hippie movement—the "back-to-the-land" ventures of the 1960s and 1970s. One commune that played a large role in the hippie movement was Kaliflower, a utopian living cooperative that existed in San Francisco between 1967 and 1973 built on values of free love and anti-capitalism.

Andrew Jacobs of The New York Times wrote that "after decades of contraction, the American commune movement has been expanding since the mid-1990s, spurred by the growth of settlements that seek to marry the utopian-minded commune of the 1960s with the American predilection for privacy and capital appreciation." The Fellowship for Intentional Community (FIC) is the best source for listings of and more information about communes in the United States.

While many American communes are short lived, some have been in operation for over 50 years. The Bruderhof was established in the US in 1954, Twin Oaks in 1967 and Koinonia Farm in 1942. Twin Oaks is a rare example of a non-religious commune surviving for longer than 30 years.

See also 

 Anarchist Catalonia
 Anarcho-communism
 Art commune
 Common land
 Communal land
 Commune (documentary), a 2005 documentary about Black Bear Ranch, an intentional community located in Siskiyou County, California
 Commune of Paris
 Community garden
 Counterculture of the 1960s
 Diggers and Dreamers
 Drop City
 Egalitarian communities
 Ejido, a form of Mexican land distribution resembling a commune
 Equality colony
 Fellowship for Intentional Community
 Free State Project
 Free Vermont
 Great Leap Forward, a time period in the 1950s and 1960s when the Chinese government created such communes
 Obshchina, communes of the Russian Empire
 Hramada, a Belarusian commune assembly
 Hutterite, a Christian sect that lives in communal "colonies"
 List of intentional communities
 People's commune, type of administrative level in China from 1958 – early 1980s
 Renaissance Community
 Tolstoyans
 Well-field system, a Chinese land distribution system with common lands controlled by a village
 World Brotherhood Colonies

Notes

References

Sources 

 Curl, John (2007). Memories of Drop City, The First Hippie Commune of the 1960s and the Summer of Love, a memoir. iUniverse. . Red-coral.net
 Curl, John (2009) For All The People: Uncovering the Hidden History of Cooperation, Cooperative Movements, and Communalism in America, PM Press. .
 Fitzgerald, George R. (1971). Communes Their Goals, Hopes, Problems. New York: Paulist Press.
 Hall, John R. (1978). The Ways Out: Utopian Communal Groups in an Age of Babylon. London: Routledge & Kegan Paul.
 Horrox, James. (2009). A Living Revolution: Anarchism in the Kibbutz Movement. Oakland: AK Press.
 Margaret Hollenbach. (2004)Lost and Found: My Life in a Group Marriage Commune. University of New Mexico Press, .
 
 Kanter, Rosabeth Moss. (1972) Commitment and community: communes and utopias in sociological perspective. Cambridge, Massachusetts, Harvard University Press. 
 Kanter, Rosabeth Moss. (1973) Communes: creating and managing the collective life. New York, Harper & Row. 
 Lattin, Don. (2003, March 2) Twilight of Hippiedom. The San Francisco Chronicle. Retrieved March 16, 2008
 Lauber, John. (1963, June). Hawthorne's Shaker Tales [Electronic version]. Nineteenth-Century Fiction, Vol. 18, 82–86.
 
 Meunier, Rachel. (1994, December 17). Communal Living in the Late 60s and Early 70s. Retrieved March 16, 2008, from thefarm.org
 Miller, Timothy. (1997) "Assault on Eden: A Memoir of Communal Life in the Early '70s", Utopian Studies, Vol. 8, 1997.
 Roberts, Ron E. (1971). The New Communes Coming Together in America. New Jersey: Prentice Hall inc.
 Van Deusen, David. (2008) Green Mountain Communes: The Making of a Peoples’ Vermont, Catamount Tavern News Service.
 Veysey, Laurence R. (1978) The Communal Experience: Anarchist and Mystical Communities in Twentieth Century America
 
 Wild, Paul H. (1966 March). Teaching Utopia [Electronic version]. The English Journal, Vol. 55, No. 3, 335–37, 339.
 Zablocki, Benjamin. (1980, 1971) The Joyful Community: An Account of the Bruderhof: A Communal Movement Now in Its Third Generation (University of Chicago Press, 1971, reissued 1980), . (The 1980 edition of the Whole Earth Catalog called this book "the best and most useful book on communes that's been written".)
 Zablocki, Benjamin. (1980) Alienation and Charisma: A Study of Contemporary American Communes (The Free Press, 1980), .

Further reading 
 
 Curl, John (2007) Memories of Drop City, the First Hippie Commune of the 1960s and the Summer of Love: a memoir. iUniverse. .
 Kanter, Rosabeth Moss (1972) Commitment and Community: communes and utopias in sociological perspective. Cambridge, Massachusetts: Harvard University Press. 
 McLaughlin, C. and Davidson, G. (1990) Builders of the Dawn: community lifestyles in a changing world. Book Publishing Company. 
 Lupton, Robert C. (1997) Return Flight: Community Development Through Reneighboring our Cities, Atlanta, Georgia:FCS Urban Ministries.
 Moore, Charles E. Called to Community: The Life Jesus Wants for His People. Plough Publishing House, 2016.
 "Intentional Community." Plough, Plough Publishing, www.plough.com/en/topics/community/intentional-community.
 Mariani, Mike: The New Generation of Self-Created Utopias, The New York Times, January 16, 2020

External links 

 
 Federation of Egalitarian Communities
 Intentional Communities Website
 eurotopia European Directory of Communities and Ecovillages
 Intentional Communities Wiki
 List of Communes  in the Communities Directory
 Intentional Community For Media and Spirituality
 Diggers & Dreamers UK directory & Journal
 The Twitter Age Embraces Communal Living – slideshow by The New York Times
 International Communes Desk

 
Housing cooperatives
Intentional living
Living arrangements
Sharing economy
Types of communities